Gerbert is a  Germanic given name, from gar "spear" and berht "bright".

People with Gerbert as given name:
 Gerbert of Aurillac, who became Pope Silvester II
 Gerbert de Montreuil, French poet of the thirteenth century
 Gerbert Moritsevich Rappaport, (1908 - 1983), a Soviet filmmaker

Notable people with the surname Gerbert:
 Martin Gerbert, German musicologist

In popular culture:
 Gerbert (TV series), a Christian children's TV series

See also
 Gerber (disambiguation)